Oxnard is the third studio album by American musician Anderson .Paak. It was released on November 16, 2018, by 12 Tone Music, Aftermath Entertainment, and OBE. The album features guest appearances from Kadhja Bonet, Norelle, Kendrick Lamar, Sonyae Elise, Dr. Dre, Cocoa Sarai, Pusha T, Snoop Dogg, The Last Artful, Dodgr, J. Cole, Q-Tip, and BJ the Chicago Kid.

Oxnard was supported by two singles: "Tints" and "Who R U?" The album received generally positive reviews from critics, and debuted at number 11 on the US Billboard 200.

Background and release
Oxnard is Paak's first album released on Aftermath Entertainment and 12 Tone Music, and the last of his "beach series", following 2014's Venice and 2016's Malibu. The album features contributions from Dr. Dre, who was heavily involved in the making of the album and served as an executive producer. In an interview with Rolling Stone, Paak stated, "This is the album I dreamed of making in high school, when I was listening to Jay-Z's The Blueprint, The Game's The Documentary, and Kanye West's The College Dropout."

Promotion
The lead single from the album, "Tints" featuring Kendrick Lamar, was released on October 4, after premiering on Zane Lowe's Beats 1 show. On October 10, Paak announced that the album would be released on November 16 and revealed the album cover. On October 26, the music video for "Tints" was released exclusively on Apple Music, as well as a pre-order of the album, revealing its track listing. On November 9, Paak released "Who R U?" as the second single from the album.

Critical reception

Oxnard was met with generally positive reviews. At Metacritic, which assigns a normalized rating out of 100 to reviews from professional publications, the album received an average score of 73, based on 18 reviews. Aggregator AnyDecentMusic? gave it 7.0 out of 10, based on their assessment of the critical consensus.

Andy Kellman of AllMusic said, "Although Paak is still an R&B artist more so than a hip-hop one, he continues to be a stylistic outlier. Rather than pander, testify, or even seduce, he tends to express the blues when he sings". El Hunt of NME stated, "In contrast to previous albums, this wasn't made while sofa-surfing to make ends meet. As Anderson .Paak puts it, he was eating calamari and lobster instead – "every day is Christmas!" he declares dryly on "Mansa Musa". Post-mainstream breakthrough, Oxnard is a deft dissection of the fallout, just as free-ranging and hopeful as you'd imagine". Kitty Empire of The Observer claimed, "Wealth is a recurrent theme, but musicality remains to the fore. Although .Paak can do trap-influenced beats, he's just as happy marshalling psychedelic guitars and gospel uplift on resonant tracks such as "Brother's Keeper", which also features a blistering verse from Pusha T. The west coast feelgood factor turns a touch obvious when Snoop Dogg arrives for "Anywhere", but there remains a restlessness to .Paak's work.." Magazine publication XXL said, "It may not be quite the full-marks classic he'd hoped, but Oxnard is an intriguing next step for the 2016 XXL Freshman that demands repeat listening and hints that he may have a Blueprint in him yet". Kitty Richardson of The Line of Best Fit stated, "A still-formidable effort, but perhaps not the homecoming .Paak would have produced if he'd decided to go his own way".

Amongst the more mixed reviews, Rachel Aroesti concluded for The Guardian that "This meeting of joy and aggression is what defines Oxnard, and the effect is not always pleasant – it makes .Paak's trademark grooves difficult to luxuriate in – but it is still a compelling mode, and one that rehomes his old-school tastes firmly in the present". Mosi Reeves from Rolling Stone suggested "Some of the album's best tracks like "6 Summers" – where Paak cheekily turns a bizarre fantasy about a supposed Trump love child into a party chant – sway and churn with no clear direction. Meanwhile, Dre's engineering role proves a mixed blessing. While the good doctor applies his mixing skills with the loving touch of a man polishing a Chevy Chevelle, resulting in the aural equivalent of a Hollywood blockbuster lathered in Dolby-quality boom, much of what made Paak's early work so fantastic is forgotten. There's none of the grungy Blaxploitation soul that fueled Yes Lawd!, his 2016 NxWorries project with L.A. beat loop expert Knxwledge, even though it was that group's 2015 "Suede" single that reportedly inspired Dre to sign Paak in the first place".

Year-end lists

Track listing

Notes
 signifies a co-producer
 signifies an additional producer
"The Chase" features skit vocals by Sinoi Mataali and Jhair Lazo
"Headlow" features additional vocals by Kadhja Bonet, background vocals by Nicolas Hakim, and skit vocals by Jhair Lazo, Jason Pounds, and Fredwreck
"Tints" features additional vocals by Teddy Ray, J.LBS, and Tayla Parx, and skit vocals by Jason Pounds, Jhair Lazo, and Teddy Ray
"Who R U?" features additional vocals by Cocoa Sarai and Dr. Dre
"6 Summers" features additional vocals by Jason Johnson, KRS-One, Kadhja Bonet, and Cocoa Sarai
"Saviers Road" features additional vocals by Cocoa Sarai
"Smile / Petty" features background vocals by Eliza, Ruby Velle, and Sir
"Mansa Musa" features additional vocals by Rich Harrison, Dem Jointz, Sly Pyper, Blakk Soul, and Thurz
"Brother's Keeper" features background vocals by Kadhja Bonet and Cocoa Sarai
"Anywhere" features additional vocals by Cocoa Sarai
"Trippy" features additional vocals by Kadhja Bonet
"Cheers" features additional vocals by Cocoa Sarai and Sly Pyper
"Sweet Chick" features additional vocals by Cocoa Sarai
"Left to Right" features additional vocals by Foota Hype and Busta Rhymes, and background vocals by Cocoa Sarai

Personnel
Credits adapted from Tidal.

 Anderson .Paak – vocals (all tracks), drums (1, 3, 9)
 Ron Avant – vocoder (10)
 Kadhja Bonet – strings (1–2, 9)
 Mike Bozzi – masterer (3, 14)
 Stephen Bruner – bass (14)
 Curt Chambers – bass (11)
 Dr. Dre – executive producer, mixer (all tracks)
 Fredwreck – additional guitar (1), percussion (1, 5), additional piano (5), sounds (14)
 Quentin Gilkey – mixing engineer (all tracks)
 Jeff Gitelman – guitar (3)
 Kelsey Gonzales – bass (2, 5), guitar (5, 14)
 Eric Gonzalez – engineer (3–5, 10, 13)
 Eric Griggs – additional piano, bass (12)
 Om'Mas Keith – engineer (3)
 Johnny Kosich – engineer (3)
 Jhair Lazo – engineer (1–11, 13–14), sounds (13)
 Rob Lewis – piano (3)
 Vic Luevanos – engineer (8, 12–13)
 Danny McKinnon – additional guitar (3)
 Vicky Nguyen – piano (5, 13–14)
 Marcus Paul – trumpet (14)
 Pomo – drums, engineer, synthesizer (3)
 Sly Pyper – saxophone (12)
 The Regiment – horn (1)
 Jose Rios – guitar (3, 7)
 Lola A. Romero – assistant engineer (1–2), engineer (3–13)
 Matt Schaeffer – engineer (3)
 Julio Ulloa – engineer (7, 9–11)

Charts

Notes

References

2018 albums
Aftermath Entertainment albums
Anderson .Paak albums
Albums produced by 9th Wonder
Albums produced by Dr. Dre
Albums produced by Focus...
Albums produced by Q-Tip (musician)
Albums produced by Anderson .Paak